The chickcharney (also known as the chickcharnie or chickcharnee) is a legendary creature in the folklore of Andros Island in the Bahama Islands. In common legend, if a traveler meets a chickcharney and treats it well, they will be rewarded with good luck, while treating a chickcharney badly will result in bad luck and hard times. Sightings have continued into the present. It is said that the birds make their nest by bringing several pine trees together and making their nest in the middle. Several of these tree formations have been sighted.

Tyto pollens 
A forester from Oregon, Bruce G. Marcot, claimed in 1995 that the legend of the chickcharney is based on the prehistoric Bahamian barn owl Tyto pollens, although the fossil remains have never been found on Andros and the youngest fossil bones are from a layer before the arrival of the first humans, the Lucayans.

References 

Caribbean legendary creatures
Legendary birds
Bahamian culture